Biodun Obende (born 14 June 1987) is a Nigerian former women's footballer who played professionally in Finland.

Life
Obende was born in Ajegunle in 1987 into a polygamous household with nine siblings. She had seven elder brothers and one sister.

She was invited to play football in Finland by Uche Eucharia where she plays with other Nigerians. She arrived in April 2007 and she now plays professionally for Kokkolan Palloveikot. She began to play with the Finnish team NiceFutis and she was the top scorer in that year.

References

1987 births
Living people
Nigerian women's footballers
NiceFutis players
People from Lagos State
Women's association football forwards
Delta Queens F.C. players
Yoruba sportswomen